Lepraria granulata is a species of crustose and leprose lichen in the family Stereocaulaceae. It is found in mountainous locations of Eastern and Central Europe, where it usually grows over moss.

Taxonomy

Lepraria granulata was formally described as a new species in 2007 by Štěpánka Slavíková-Bayerová. The species epithet granulata alludes to the granular form of the thallus. Molecular phylogenetic analysis shows it to be a genetically distinct member of the Lepraria neglecta species complex.

Description
The  whitish grey to grey thallus of Lepraria granulata is crustose in form. It comprises tiny, loosely packed granules up to 0.3 mm in diameter, often without any hyphae projecting from them. The lichen is sterile, as neither ascomata nor conidiomata are produced. It contains atranorin, a common lichen product, some anthraquinones, as well as two unidentified fatty acids. The expected results of standard chemical spot tests are: thallus PD− or PD+ (faint yellowish), K+ (yellowish); the orange-brown hyphae present below the thallus are K+ (purple-red); while the other hyphae below the thallus are K−.

Habitat and distribution
Lepraria granulata typically grows on moss, also  it has been recorded on soil, in fissures between boulders, and over moss growing in these fissures. Mosses often recorded growing with Lepraria granulata are Bartramia ithyphylla, Coscinodon cribrosus, Grimmia caespiticia, Dicranoweisia crispula, Grimmia cf. alpestris, G. sessitana, and Lescuraea incurvata. Lepraria borealis, L. elobata and L. neglecta are some commonly associating lichens.

References

granulata
Lichen species
Lichens described in 2007
Lichens of Central Europe
Lichens of Southeastern Europe